"Meeting in the Ladies Room" is a song recorded by Klymaxx for the MCA Records label, and the title track from their fourth album. It was written by Reggie Calloway, Vincent Calloway, and Boaz Watson. It was released as a single, reaching number 4 on the Billboard R&B chart, number 59 on the Billboard Hot 100 chart and peaked  at number 22 on the Billboard Hot Dance Club Play chart.

History
The success of this song helped their Meeting in the Ladies Room album reach Platinum status. The song's music video was directed by Gerald Casale of Devo and featured an appearance from a then-unknown Vivica A. Fox. The song was also included on the MCA Records motion picture soundtrack for 1985's Secret Admirer. Billboard named the song #85 on their list of 100 Greatest Girl Group Songs of All Time. The song was also featured in an episode of the FX series Pose and in the third season of Logo TV's RuPaul's Drag Race. In addition, a comedy sketch parodying the song was featured in an episode of Saturday Night Live  as part of their forty-fourth season.

Personnel
Lead vocals Bernadette Cooper, Lorena Porter and Lynn Malsby
Background vocals by Klymaxx

Charts

References

1985 singles
Klymaxx songs
1984 songs
MCA Records singles
Songs written by Reggie Calloway